Pat Lawlor (born 1948) is a retired Irish hurler. He played for his local club Bennettsbridge club and was a member of the Kilkenny senior inter-county team in the early 1970s.

References

Living people
Bennettsbridge hurlers
Kilkenny inter-county hurlers
Leinster inter-provincial hurlers
All-Ireland Senior Hurling Championship winners
1948 births